Board game development is the entire process of creating, developing and producing a board game. It includes game design, product development, funding, marketing and promotion. The process of board game design bears certain similarities to software design.

Key Design Phases
There are many ways to do regarding developing and designing a board game. There is not a single method, but there can be some suggested steps. These steps center more around the design aspect of the process, according to Instructables.com.

Conceptualisation 
Creating a concept for a Board Game can be a challenging step in the design process. This will form a basis of what the game is based upon and will influence future development. Characteristics that are developed include theme (e.g.. sci-fi, fantasy, war, sports, etc.) or a set of game mechanics (e.g. card drafting, deck building, dice combat, set collection, roll and write, etc.). Whatever comes first, the other elements can then be developed. During this period, subsequent elements can feedback to the original concept thereby altering it. Other games can provide elements which can be utilised at this stage.

Determine the Goal of the Game 
Determining the goal of the game is the time consuming part of the design process. This is a period of idea jotting or sketching. Any idea that sparks interest should be written down and considered. Nothing is too minor or major to be considered. This could include character types or names, actions, components, theme, rules, win conditions, complexity and many more. After a long gestation period, there should be a solid understanding of what a player is trying to accomplish and the general path they will take through the journey.

This is a good time to start organizing these thoughts, memos and considerations into an outline. A great resource for a game design outline can be found here, on pages 2 through 4. This will help streamline these thoughts into a coherent flow from opening story and background through gameplay to the conclusion and win conditions.

Flesh it out 
Allow time (this can be a long step) to come up with additional mechanics and gameplay. This includes a methodical analysis of the flow, probabilities, balance and mechanics. Track game time, how many times something happens, excitement level to be playing the game, and whatever else is necessary. Record any ideas that come to mind.

Make a prototype 
This is where you make a playable version of your game. It will have all of the mechanics and pieces of your game, but it doesn't have to have perfectly shaped anything or be polished at all - this is just so that you can play test the game. This is a very fluid step where many things can change, even theme. Mechanics, characters, stats or anything can be added as well.

Play testing 
Play testing is means whereby the design can be tested through playing the game. This can be done by a game designer on their own before involving others. Then, the game should be brought in front of others. The components should be simple at this stage. Playing with someone else brings in a new perspective and establishes a lot: initially the game will need to be tweaked and may be broken, but by returning to it will be possible to fix such issues as probability, numbers and other similar things.

Make it look pretty and write rules 
Once you are happy with the final product, it is time to develop the rulebook. Note that if the previous stages in board game development were followed, finalising the rulebook should be straight forward. Now you can enjoy (or try marketing it)!

Manufacturing 
There are at least 80 printers worldwide that specialize in manufacturing board games. Majority of plastic figure production happens in China.

Another set of steps 
Board game development could be broken down into these six steps, according to a different source:

Content analysis
This is a form of brainstorming aimed at creating a list of suitable topics which fit with the theme of the game.

Incubation
This involves subsequent reflection on the list of topics and the addition of new topics.

Chunking
This involves assigning the topics to one of the following gaming elements:
 Pieces
 Patterns
 Paths
 Probabilities
 Prizes
 Principles

Aligning
This involves aligning the content structure with the game structure.

Drafting
This is hands-on experimenting with the physical elements of the game and the development of an explanatory set of rules.

Incubating
This is a second period of reflection allowing the sub-conscious help come up with more ideas.

References

Board games